The End is a 2012 Spanish thriller film directed by Jorge Torregrossa and based on David Monteagudo's novel Fin, with a screenplay by Sergio G. Sánchez and Jorge Guerricaechevarría. The film is a MOD Producciones, Apaches Entertainment, Antena 3 Films and Misent Producciones production. It was first screened at the 2012 Toronto International Film Festival in September and later opened in Spain on 23 November of the same year. The film also marks the screen debut of model Andrés Velencoso.

Plot

Felix is invited to a weekend reunion with a group of old friends at a remote mountain cabin. It has been twenty years since the group last met, and although at first it seems that little has changed between them, behind the laughter and stories, secrets emerge from their collective past that create rifts between the friends.

Before leaving for the reunion, Felix is stopped in the subway by a strange man carrying a sheaf of drawings. Only much later does he realise that the man is one of his friends, Ángel, although he does not recognise him at the time. Later, as Felix and his new girlfriend Eva drive to the cabin, Felix describes his friends to Eva (who does not know any of them), although he evades her questions about Ángel.

Eva is introduced to Felix's friends –
Sergio (whose family owns the cabin), Sergio's wife Sara, party boy Rafa, the motherly Maribel, handsome playboy Hugo, and Hugo's new wife Cova (who, like Eva, has never met the other members of the group). As the group reminisces and parties late into the night, tensions begin to surface.

Eva soon learns that Felix had previously had a brief relationship with Maribel. As time passes Sara, who has apparently organised the weekend, becomes increasingly agitated by the absence of the mysterious Ángel (whom the friends refer to as "The Prophet"). Finally she confesses that it was Ángel himself who had instructed her to invite everyone to Sergio's cabin for the reunion, a revelation that greatly disturbs the rest of the group.

Later, while Eva is making mojitos in the kitchen (and just as Felix had warned her), the philandering Hugo makes a pass at Eva; she rejects him, but the encounter is seen by Hugo's wife Cova.

Late that night, sitting around the campfire, an intoxicated Sergio strips naked and throws his clothes into the fire. He taunts Rafa about the failure of his business, then claims that he has spiked the group's food and drink with hallucinogenic mushrooms. The ensuing argument leads to a disturbing revelation – at their last gathering 20 years earlier, several of the friends had forced Ángel to take a large quantity of unknown drugs, which had apparently tipped Ángel into schizophrenia, causing him to become violent and delusional,   and he had to be institutionalised.

Moments later the group is startled by an eerie flash that illuminates the entire night sky, accompanied by an ominous rumbling; when it ceases the friends hear the sound of animals and birds crying out in panic. They soon discover that all power and communications are out, all electrical and electronic devices including their cars and phones are totally inoperable, and they have no contact with the outside world and no way to leave except on foot. They also notice that all the clock in the house has stopped at the exact moment of the flash, 12:20am.

The next morning the group decides to walk to the next farm to get help, but they find it totally deserted, with two vultures scavenging food from the dining table, and everything appears as if the occupants have left very suddenly. The friends also notice that the clock here has also stopped at 12:20am.

As they move on further, they come across a hikers' campsite, but it too is totally deserted, and they are puzzled by why the hikers would leave all their expensive hiking gear behind. They gradually realise that the phenomena caused by the previous night's event seem to be in effect everywhere, and that all the people they might have expected to encounter have apparently vanished, as if into thin air.

The group begins to realize that some invisible power or force is abroad, that it is apparently making people disappear, and that this apparently affects only humans, since the group repeatedly observe animals, although these act in an increasingly strange and sometimes aggressive manner.

Heading down the mountain, they traverse a narrow, precipitous path cut high into the face of a steep river gorge. Halfway along, the group is suddenly charged by a panicked herd of mountain goats; the stampeding animals push Hugo off the path and he almost falls to his death, but after his friends rescue him the group realizes that Cova too has inexplicably vanished.

Further down the gorge they come upon a lorry full of sheep that has crashed into the wall of a road tunnel. The driver has vanished, although the seat belt is still fastened, and they realise that the truck has collided with another vehicle, which has crashed through the guard-rail down into the gorge. They are horrified to discover that the dead driver (who is still behind the wheel) is their missing friend Ángel. They realize that he was killed in the car accident on his way to the cabin – although his watch reveals that he had died some hours before the mysterious phenomenon, suggesting that the mysterious force is only taking living people. Felix also recovers Ángel's sketchbook, which is filled with a sequence of strange, ominous drawings.

When they reach the bottom of the gorge Hugo and Felix go for a swim in the river, but after a short argument about Cova, Hugo walks away from Felix, and dives back into the river, but he does not surface. Although Felix and Sara both dive into the pool in search of him, they soon realise that Hugo too has vanished without a trace.

Hours later, the remaining four – Felix, Eva, Sara and Maribel – arrive at a caravan park, but it too is completely deserted. They find bicycles, collect some food, and decide to ride to the nearest town, but just as they are about leave they are suddenly surrounded by a pack of ravenous German Shepherd dogs, which begin to attack them. They are forced to abandon the food and flee for their lives on the bicycles, with the dogs in hot pursuit, but just as the pack is about to catch Sara, the dogs inexplicably turn and run the other way as if in fear of something ahead of the group. Moments later, Felix, who is riding in front, hears the panicked Sara sobbing and calling to him not to leave her; he tries to reassure her, but moments later he realises he can no longer hear her, and when he, Maribel and Eva stop, Sara has vanished, and only the  bicycle she was riding remains on the side of the road.

Sometime later, the surviving trio see an object hurtling down from the sky on fire, and it crashes nearby. When they investigate, they find the wreckage of Jumbo Jet, but there is no trace of the bodies of any passengers on board.  Felix concludes that the plane must have been in the air since before last night's mysterious event, and that it must have flown on with no-one on board until it ran out of fuel. He surmises that the mysterious event must have happened everywhere.

Reaching the port town, they find that it too is totally empty, except for a few animals. They go to the church to ring the bell and raise the alarm, but there is no response. Inside, Felix reveals to Maribel that the images in Ángel's sketchbook are indeed prophetic, depicting in sequence each of the bizarre incidents that have befallen them. He also confesses that he has not shown it to Eva because he has realised that only he and Maribel appear in the penultimate drawing.

Maribel then hears the sound of a child's cry. Following the sound, they see a little girl running away from them through the narrow streets, but they also hear the approaching roar of a lion that has escaped from a visiting circus. They chase the terrified girl to the local marina, where she locks herself in the cabin of a yacht, but while Sara tries to convince the girl to unlock the cabin, she is horrified to see the girl vanish before her eyes.

Felix and Eva then realise that the escaped lion has followed them to the marina and is blocking their escape, but (as he had explained the night before) Felix has gained his mariner's licence and can sail them to safety aboard the yacht. He tells Eva and Maribel to cast off the ropes and gangway, but Maribel (finally realising what has happened to her own children) ignores Felix and Eva's pleas to get on board, she deliberately walks toward the lion, and is killed by it.

Now apparently the only survivors of the catastrophe, Felix and Eva sail out to sea. Felix reveals that, at the car crash site, he had also found the torn-out final page of Ángel's prophetic sketchbook, which seems to indicate that only Eva will survive. They go to sleep that night on the yacht, expecting that Felix will vanish, but they awake the next morning both still alive and together. The final scene shows the boat sailing into an unknown future as it fades out of sight into a luminous mist.

Cast

See also 
 List of Spanish films of 2012

References

External links
 
 Official website

2012 films
2012 thriller films
2012 directorial debut films
Spanish thriller films
2010s Spanish-language films
MOD Producciones films
Apache Films films
2010s Spanish films
Atresmedia Cine films